Stratum membranosum or membranous layer may refer to:
 Membranous layer, the deepest layer of subcutaneous tissue
 Fascia of Scarpa, the stratum membranosum of the abdominal wall
 Fascia of Colles, the stratum membranosum of the perineum